Sleepaway Camp (released as Nightmare Vacation in the United Kingdom) is a 1983 American slasher film written and directed by Robert Hiltzik, who also served as executive producer. It is the first film in the Sleepaway Camp film series, and tells the story of a young girl sent to a summer camp that becomes the site of a series of murders shortly after her arrival. It stars Felissa Rose, Katherine Kamhi, Paul DeAngelo, Mike Kellin (in his last screen appearance), and Christopher Collet (in his first).

Released during the heyday of slasher movies, the film is known for its infamous twist ending, considered to be one of the genre's most shocking. Since its release, the film received a positive critical response and a cult following. It was followed by four sequels, Sleepaway Camp II: Unhappy Campers (1988), Sleepaway Camp III: Teenage Wasteland (1989), Return to Sleepaway Camp (2008), and Sleepaway Camp IV: The Survivor (2012).

Plot
In 1975, John Baker and his boyfriend, Lenny, take John's children Angela and Peter on a boating trip. After the boat capsizes, John and the children attempt to swim ashore. However they swim into the path of a reckless motorboat and are struck. John and Peter are killed.

8 years later, in 1983, Angela is now traumatized. She has been living with her eccentric aunt, Dr. Martha Thomas, and her cousin Ricky Thomas. Angela and Ricky are sent to Camp Arawak. Due to her introverted nature, Angela is bullied, her main tormentors being fellow camper Judy and camp counselor Meg. The head cook, Artie, attempts to molest Angela as well. Later, an unseen figure causes Artie to get severely scalded by the water he is boiling. Artie's incident is deemed accidental by camp owner Mel Costic.

Campers Kenny and Mike also mock Angela, prompting Ricky and his friend Paul to get into a fight with them. Paul befriends Angela. Kenny is later drowned, his death also ruled accidental by Mel. Paul asks Angela to attend a movie with him and kisses her. Campers Billy and Jimmy pick on Angela, and Billy is killed next, stung to death when someone traps him with a beehive. Mel starts thinking there is a killer in the camp.

The relationship between Angela and Paul grows strained when Paul kisses her again, causing Angela to have a flashback to her youth when she and her brother witnessed their father in bed with Lenny. Paul is seduced by Judy, and the two are found kissing by Angela. Guilty, Paul attempts to explain himself but is shooed away by Judy and Meg, who throw Angela into the water. Angela then has sand flung at her by small children. She is comforted by Ricky, who swears revenge on her aggressors. Meg is killed next in the shower.

A camp social is held. At the event, Paul apologizes to Angela again and she tells him to meet her at the water. Mel finds Meg's body. Four of the six children who threw sand at Angela are found hacked to bits. Soon after, Judy is killed by being raped with a lit curling iron. The camp is thrown into a panic with all the deaths. Thinking Ricky is the killer, Mel beats him mercilessly, only to be shot in the throat and killed with an arrow by the real killer.

Police begin searching for the missing campers. Paul is at the beach with Angela, who suggests they go for a swim. The policeman discovers Ricky, unconscious but alive. Ronnie and Susie find a naked Angela humming and clutching a hunting knife and Paul's severed head. They are shocked to discover that "Angela" is actually Peter, her thought-to-be-dead brother. It is revealed that the real Angela died in the accident and Peter survived. After Martha gained custody of him, she decided to raise Peter as the girl she always wanted, already having a son. It is implied that Peter was mentally affected by seeing his father sharing a homosexual embrace with another man. 

The nude and blood-covered "Angela" (with male genitalia in full view), stands before the shocked Susie and Ronnie who discover that she is the killer; Angela looks at both of them while letting out an animalistic hissing sound.

Cast

 Felissa Rose as Angela / Peter Baker
 Frank Sorrentino as young Peter
 Colette Lee Corcoran as young Angela
 Jonathan Tiersten as Ricky Thomas
 Karen Fields as Judy
 Christopher Collet as Paul
 Mike Kellin as Mel Kostic
 Katherine Kamhi as Meg
 Paul DeAngelo as Ronnie Angelo
 Susan Glaze as Susie
 Amy Baio as Brooke Warner
 Tom Van Dell as Mike
 Loris Sallahian as Billy
 John E. Dunn as Kenny
 Ethan Larosa as Jimmy
 Willy Kuskin as Mozart
 Desiree Gould as Aunt Martha Thomas
 Owen Hughes as Artie
 Robert Earl Jones as Ben
 Frank Trent Saladino as Gene
 Rick Edrich as Jeff
 Fred Greene as Eddie
 Allen Breton as Frank the Cop
 Lisa Buckler as Leslie 
 Michael C. Mahon as Hal
 Dan Tursi as John Baker
 James Paradise as Lenny
 Paul Poland as Craig
 Alyson Mord as Mary Ann
 Carol Robinson as Dolores

Analysis

Film critic and transgender woman Willow Maclay, in an essay about Sleepaway Camp for the magazine Cléo, characterizes the film's ending, in which Angela is revealed to have a penis, as both a unique element that sets it apart from other slasher films of the era and "deeply transmisogynistic". Maclay criticized the film for its "equation of mental instability with having grown up in a gender role not concurrent with your identity. Nearly every single transgender person grows up being raised in a gender role that does not fit, and that doesn't mean that they are mentally ill or seriously violent".

BJ Colangelo, in an editorial for Dread Central, wrote that "the ending of Sleepaway Camp offers two reveals that are wildly offensive to the LGBTQ+ community", referring to the reveal of Angela's penis as transphobic, and the reveal that their deceased father was homosexual as homophobic. However, Colangelo adds that the film "is terrible transgender representation, yes, but it's an incredible metaphor about how forcing gender roles onto someone that doesn't align with who they are is fucking dangerous. If Peter had not been forced to live his life as 'Angela', the events of Sleepaway Camp would have been avoided". Colangelo clarifies that she is not arguing that gender dysphoria causes those experiencing it to become murderers, but rather that "children experiencing gender dysphoria and living in non-affirming homes are prone to depression, thoughts of suicide, and yes, sometimes violent outbursts".

Transgender writer Alice Collins of Bloody Disgusting stated that Sleepaway Camp "is steeped in queerness, especially when compared to its contemporaries. In its day it took a deeper look into the subject matter than that of other films. Angela and Peter's dad is a closeted gay man, there's forced gender bending (which is abuse rather than queer but people will see it as such), and the majority of the scantily clad people in the film are men with all those very short shorts that leave little to the imagination while there is little skin shown of the feminine variety". Collins argues that Angela is a transgender girl, noting that, in the film's sequels, Angela is presented as a woman who uses feminine pronouns: "So despite Aunt Martha being insane, she just happened to stumble upon a person who was already a girl; and it was an accident that her brainwashing worked".

Production
The filming of Sleepaway Camp took place in Argyle, New York near Summit Lake at a camp formerly known as Camp Algonquin. In interviews, screenwriter and director, Robert Hiltzik, has said that he attended that camp as a child. The movie was filmed in five weeks starting in September 1982 and ending in October of that year on a budget of $350,000. The film had been storyboarded but after the first day of filming, the movie was already behind schedule. The storyboards could not be used and were thrown out. The trees, with their leaves turning, belie the summer setting of the film.

Unlike many of its contemporaries, which had adults portraying youth, the cast of Sleepaway Camp was primarily made up of adolescent actors.

Release
Sleepaway Camp opened in 85 theatres in New York City on November 18, 1983. According to the American Film Institute, it had its premiere in Los Angeles the following spring on May 25, 1984. The August 1984 Box review reported that the first week box-office gross at fifteen Los Angeles, California theaters was $90,000.

Home media
Anchor Bay Entertainment released Sleepaway Camp on DVD on August 8, 2000. Anchor Bay reissued this disc as part of a four-disc set titled the Sleepaway Camp Survival Kit on August 20, 2002, which also contained the film's two sequels, as well as a bonus disc featuring footage from the unfinished third sequel. This boxed set, which featured a medical red cross on the front cover, was discontinued in late 2002 after the Red Cross filed a complaint against Anchor Bay, which subsequently redesigned the box art to remove the cross logo. In 2005, the Canadian-based Legacy Entertainment released a region-free budget DVD release of the film. Unlike the original VHS release, this release contains numerous edits to the film to either shorten violence or certain moments like dialogue.

Scream Factory released the film in a collector's edition Blu-ray set on May 27, 2014. This release contains a 2K scan of the original camera negative, and this release also has the film in its original uncut version, unlike the DVD released by Anchor Bay.

Reception

Critical response

Contemporary
On release, the film was frequently compared to Friday the 13th due to their shared settings and whodunit plot structure.

A review in The Courier-Journal characterized the film as a "low-budget slasher in the Friday the 13th mold, with teen-age mayhem at a summer camp". In the Chula Vista Star-News, the film was deemed "a tasteless picture about mysterious murders at a summer youth camp that obscenely blends beheadings, stabbings, pubescent impulses, homosexuality, and transvestism with a cast of junior-high-school actors". The News-Press called it "a shockingly good slasher film, if you use the relatively fine, first Friday the 13th as a measuring stick... it's just another crazed killer stalking nubile summer campers. But, this time, there are some truly creative killings and interesting plot twists".

Modern
The consensus reads: "Sleepaway Camp is a standard teen slasher elevated by occasional moments of John Waters-esque weirdness and a twisted ending". On Metacritic, the film was reviewed by 4 critics and got a rank of 58 out of a 100, which indicates "mixed or average reviews".

The website Bloody Disgusting gave the film a positive review, praising Felissa Rose's performance and the film's twist ending calling it "one of the most shocking seen since, possibly, Hitchcock's Psycho". AllMovie wrote in its review on the film: "While most of the gender-bending story's sexual confusion is ultimately half-baked... Sleepaway Camp is distinctive enough to warrant required viewing for genre enthusiasts".

Over the years, the film has gained a cult following from fans of the slasher genre and garnered critical reappraisal. Film scholar Bartłomiej Paszylk called the film "an exceptionally bad movie but a very good slasher". Commenting on the performances in the film, film scholar Thomas Sipos wrote "[the film] feels odd due to its contrasting acting styles. Most of the cast performs in a naturalistic manner, whereas Desiree Gould's performance as Aunt Martha is strikingly stylistic: broadly overplayed to the point of caricature".

In his book The Pleasure and Pain of Cult Horror Films: A Historical Survey (2009), Paszylk characterized Sleepaway Camp as "elevat[ing] the kids to the position of the movie's mass protagonist and becomes a tricky metaphor of the unspeakable pains and anxieties of growing up". He further commented on the film's conclusion: "The epiphanous ending brings Sleepaway Camp further away from the likes of Friday the 13th and closer to such 1980s 'slashers with a twist' as Happy Birthday to Me (1981) and April Fool's Day (1986), but Hiltzik's movie goes even further than that: in this case the denouement doesn't just add a new dimension to everything we saw up to this point, but it pushes its way deep into our minds and stays with us forever".

The film was featured on episode 48 of the podcast How Did This Get Made? where hosts Paul Scheer, Jason Mantzoukas, June Diane Raphael, and guest host Zack Pearlman struggled to decipher the film's opening moments, due to the ambiguous relationships established at the beginning of the film. Scheer later recalled that it had been the most fan-requested film "by a landslide".

Other media

Sequels
In the late 1980s, Hiltzik sold the rights to the successive Sleepaway Camp films, after which Michael A. Simpson directed two sequels, Sleepaway Camp II: Unhappy Campers (1988) and Sleepaway Camp III: Teenage Wasteland (1989). In them, Angela (now played by Bruce Springsteen's younger sister, Pamela Springsteen) resurfaces at a nearby summer camp, but this time masquerading as a counselor after a sex reassignment surgery. Much like at the previous camp, she gleefully tortures and kills anyone who misbehaves or annoys her. These films had more of a satirical comic tone than the original.

Another sequel, Sleepaway Camp IV: The Survivor, directed by Jim Markovic, was partially filmed in the early 1990s but left incomplete. In 2002, the unfinished footage was released and made available as an exclusive fourth disc in Anchor Bay/Starz Entertainment's Sleepaway Camp DVD boxed set. In 2012, the film was completed using archival footage from the first three films and released on DVD and Amazon Video on Demand.

A fifth film, Return to Sleepaway Camp, was completed in 2003 and initially struggled to have its visual effects completed. It was directed by Robert Hiltzik, the director of the original 1983 film. According to Fangoria, the digital effects were redone from 2006 to 2008. The film was released in 2008.

The purportedly final film in the Sleepaway Camp series, titled Sleepaway Camp Reunion, was also announced to be in the works. Distribution had been arranged via Magnolia Pictures. Creator Robert Hiltzik, who recovered the rights to the franchise, has stated that he would make the film if his budget was met. However, Hiltzik and Return To Sleepaway Camp producer Jeff Hayes later announced themselves as having started work on a reboot that would retain the key characters and elements of the original film with additional storyline elements and a dose of modernizing. As of Summer 2014, Hiltzik was reportedly tweaking the script. In addition, Michael Simpson, the director of Sleepaway Camp II: Unhappy Campers and Sleepaway Camp III: Teenage Wasteland, wrote a script for an additional film called Sleepaway Camp: Berserk.

Karen Fields reprised her role from Sleepaway Camp in the 2014 short film Judy, although it wasn't technically a sequel. The Jeff Hayes-directed film was included in the collector's edition Blu-ray release of the original Sleepaway Camp.

According to horror-movie fansite Bloody Disgusting, a reboot of Sleepaway Camp is in the works, starring Felissa Rose.

Documentaries
A documentary film on the series, titled Angela: The Official Sleepaway Camp Documentary, is currently in pre-production, with Felissa Rose as executive producer.

References

Works cited

External links
 
 
 

1983 horror films
1983 independent films
1983 directorial debut films
1980s horror thriller films
1980s mystery films
1980s serial killer films
1980s slasher films
1980s teen horror films
American independent films
American slasher films
American teen LGBT-related films
American teen horror films
Backwoods slasher films
Films about bullying
Films about cousins
Films about dysfunctional families
Films about pranks
Films about sexual repression
Films about siblings
Films about summer camps
American films about revenge
Films set in New York (state)
Films set in 1975
Films set in 1983
Films shot in New York (state)
LGBT-related horror films
Sleepaway Camp (film series)
Transgender-related films
1983 LGBT-related films
American LGBT-related films
LGBT-related controversies in film
1980s English-language films
1980s American films